The NACA airfoils are airfoil shapes for aircraft wings developed by the National Advisory Committee for Aeronautics (NACA). The shape of the NACA airfoils is described using a series of digits following the word "NACA".  The parameters in the numerical code can be entered into equations to precisely generate the cross-section of the airfoil and calculate its properties.

Origins
NACA initially developed the numbered airfoil system which was further refined by the United States Air Force at Langley Research Center. According to the NASA website:

Four-digit series
The NACA four-digit wing sections define the profile by:
 First digit describing maximum camber as percentage of the chord.
 Second digit describing the distance of maximum camber from the airfoil leading edge in tenths of the chord.
 Last two digits describing maximum thickness of the airfoil as percent of the chord.

For example, the NACA 2412 airfoil has a maximum camber of 2% located 40% (0.4 chords) from the leading edge with a maximum thickness of 12% of the chord.

The NACA 0015 airfoil is symmetrical, the 00 indicating that it has no camber. The 15 indicates that the airfoil has a 15% thickness to chord length ratio: it is 15% as thick as it is long.

Equation for a symmetrical 4-digit NACA airfoil

The formula for the shape of a NACA 00xx foil, with "xx" being replaced by the percentage of thickness to chord, is

 
where:
 x is the position along the chord from 0 to 1.00 (0 to 100%),
  is the half thickness at a given value of x (centerline to surface),
 t is the maximum thickness as a fraction of the chord (so t gives the last two digits in the NACA 4-digit denomination divided by 100).

Note that in this equation, at x = 1 (the trailing edge of the airfoil), the thickness is not quite zero. If a zero-thickness trailing edge is required, for example for computational work, one of the coefficients should be modified such that they sum to zero. Modifying the last coefficient (i.e. to −0.1036) will result in the smallest change to the overall shape of the airfoil. The leading edge approximates a cylinder with a chord-normalized radius of

 

 

Symmetrical 4-digit series airfoils by default have maximum thickness at 30% of the chord from the leading edge.

Equation for a cambered 4-digit NACA airfoil

The simplest asymmetric foils are the NACA 4-digit series foils, which use the same formula as that used to generate the 00xx symmetric foils, but with the line of mean camber bent.  The formula used to calculate the mean camber line is

 
where
 m is the maximum camber (100 m is the first of the four digits),
 p is the location of maximum camber (10 p is the second digit in the NACA xxxx description).

For example, a NACA 2412 airfoil uses a 2% camber (first digit) 40% (second digit) along the chord of a 0012 symmetrical airfoil having a thickness 12% (digits 3 and 4) of the chord.

 

where

Five-digit series
The NACA five-digit series describes more complex airfoil shapes. Its format is LPSTT, where:
 L: a single digit representing the theoretical optimal lift coefficient at ideal angle of attack CLI = 0.15 L (this is not the same as the lift coefficient CL),
 P: a single digit for the x coordinate of the point of maximum camber (max. camber at x = 0.05 P),
 S: a single digit indicating whether the camber is simple (S = 0) or reflex (S = 1),
 TT: the maximum thickness in percent of chord, as in a four-digit NACA airfoil code.
For example, the NACA 23112 profile describes an airfoil with design lift coefficient of 0.3 (0.15 × 2), the point of maximum camber located at 15% chord (5 × 3), reflex camber (1), and maximum thickness of 12% of chord length (12).

The camber line for the simple case (S = 0) is defined in two sections:

 

where the chordwise location  and the ordinate  have been normalized by the chord. Finally, constant  is determined to give the desired lift coefficient. For a 230 camber-line profile (the first 3 numbers in the 5-digit series),  is used.

Non-reflexed 3 digit camber lines
3-digit camber lines provide a very far forward location for the maximum camber.

The camber line is defined as

 

with the camber line gradient
 

The following table presents the various camber-line profile coefficients:

Reflexed 3-digit camber lines

Camber lines such as 231 makes the negative trailing edge camber of the 230 series profile to be positively cambered.  This results in a theoretical pitching moment of 0.

From 

 

From 

The following table presents the various camber-line profile coefficients:

Modifications
Four- and five-digit series airfoils can be modified with a two-digit code preceded by a hyphen in the following sequence:

 One digit describing the roundness of the leading edge, with 0 being sharp, 6 being the same as the original airfoil, and larger values indicating a more rounded leading edge.
 One digit describing the distance of maximum thickness from the leading edge in tenths of the chord.

For example, the NACA 1234-05 is a NACA 1234 airfoil with a sharp leading edge and maximum thickness 50% of the chord (0.5 chords) from the leading edge.

In addition, for a more precise description of the airfoil all numbers can be presented as decimals.

1-series
A new approach to airfoil design pioneered in the 1930s, in which the airfoil shape was mathematically derived from the desired lift characteristics. Prior to this, airfoil shapes were first created and then had their characteristics measured in a wind tunnel. The 1-series airfoils are described by five digits in the following sequence:
 The number "1" indicating the series.
 One digit describing the distance of the minimum-pressure area in tenths of chord.
 A hyphen.
 One digit describing the lift coefficient in tenths.
 Two digits describing the maximum thickness in percent of chord.
For example, the NACA 16-123 airfoil has minimum pressure 60% of the chord back with a lift coefficient of 0.1 and maximum thickness of 23% of the chord.

6-series
An improvement over 1-series airfoils with emphasis on maximizing laminar flow. The airfoil is described using six digits in the following sequence:
 The number "6" indicating the series.
 One digit describing the distance of the minimum pressure area in tenths of the chord.
 The subscript digit gives the range of lift coefficient in tenths above and below the design lift coefficient in which favorable pressure gradients exist on both surfaces.
 A hyphen.
 One digit describing the design lift coefficient in tenths.
 Two digits describing the maximum thickness as percent of chord.
 "a=" followed by a decimal number describing the fraction of chord over which laminar flow is maintained. a=1 is the default if no value is given.

For example, the NACA 612-315 a=0.5 has the area of minimum pressure 10% of the chord back, maintains low drag 0.2 above and below the lift coefficient of 0.3, has a maximum thickness of 15% of the chord, and maintains laminar flow over 50% of the chord.

7-series
Further advancement in maximizing laminar flow achieved by separately identifying the low-pressure zones on upper and lower surfaces of the airfoil. The airfoil is described by seven digits in the following sequence:
 The number "7" indicating the series.
 One digit describing the distance of the minimum pressure area on the upper surface in tenths of the chord.
 One digit describing the distance of the minimum pressure area on the lower surface in tenths of the chord.
 One letter referring to a standard profile from the earlier NACA series.
 One digit describing the lift coefficient in tenths.
 Two digits describing the maximum thickness as percent of chord.

For example, the NACA 712A315 has the area of minimum pressure 10% of the chord back on the upper surface and 20% of the chord back on the lower surface, uses the standard "A" profile, has a lift coefficient of 0.3, and has a maximum thickness of 15% of the chord.

8-series
Supercritical airfoils designed to independently maximize laminar flow above and below the wing. The numbering is identical to the 7-series airfoils except that the sequence begins with an "8" to identify the series.

See also
NACA cowling
NACA duct

References

External links
  

 UIUC Airfoil Coordinate Database coordinates for nearly 1,600 airfoils
 John Dreese's NACA airfoil coordinate generation program Works on Windows XP, 7 and 8.
 NACA Airfoil Series
 NASA website feature on NACA airfoils
 Airfoil Interactive WebApp
Aerodynamics
Aircraft wing design
Airfoil
https://engineeringjournals.stmjournals.in/index.php/JoMA/article/view/3639